Namasagali is a town in Eastern Uganda. It is one of the metropolitan areas in Kamuli District.

Location
The coordinates of Namasagali are:01 00 45N, 32 57 00E (Latitude:1.0125; Longitude:32.9500).

Population
As of February 2010, the exact population of Namasagali is not known.

Landmarks
The landmarks within the town limits or close to its borders include:

 The offices of Kamuli Town Council
 Namasagali Central Market - The largest fresh-produce market in the town
 The Namasagali Campus of Busitema University - One of the forty (40) public and private universities in Uganda.
 Namasagali College - A private, mixed, residential high school

External links
 Kamuli District Internet Portal
 Busitema University Homepage

See also
 Kamuli
 Kamuli District
 Busitema University
 Namasagali College

References

Populated places on the Nile
Populated places in Eastern Region, Uganda
Cities in the Great Rift Valley
Kamuli District